Urtė Kazakevičiūtė (born 15 October 1993) is a Lithuanian swimmer. During 2009 World Aquatics Championships she reached national Lithuanian records at 50 m and 200 m breaststroke events. Kazakevičiūtė was one of the three and most successful countrie's swimmers in first 2010 Youth Olympics. Currently she swims for Northern Arizona University, located in Flagstaff, Arizona, United States of America, where she boasts many wins in her divisional championships.

Achievements

References 

Lithuanian female breaststroke swimmers
1993 births
Living people
Swimmers at the 2010 Summer Youth Olympics